Mumbai City Football Club is an Indian professional football club based in Mumbai, Maharashtra, that competes in the Indian Super League, the top flight of Indian football. The club was founded in August 2014, during the inaugural season of the Indian Super League. Mumbai City is the first club to win both the ISL title and League Winners Shield, which it did in the 2020–21 season. They won the ISL League Winners Shield again in 2022–23 season. Also, Mumbai City is the first club from India to win an AFC Champions League group stage match.

Former England international Peter Reid managed the club during the first season with Freddie Ljungberg as the marquee player. For the second season, it was announced that Nicolas Anelka would take the role of marquee player cum manager of the club. In 2016, Diego Forlán played as the marquee player while Alexandre Guimarães took over as the new manager. In 2018, Jorge Costa was announced as the head coach for the new season and he guided them to the play-offs in his realm. In 2020, Sergio Lobera was announced as the manager for the new season and they won the Indian Super League winners shield and the league title for the first time during the 2020–21 Indian Super League season. 
Des Buckingham who was appointed as the head coach before the 2021-22 Indian Super League season, led the team to two wins in the 2022 AFC Champions League making Mumbai the first Indian team to win a game at the AFC Champions League group stage, and ended up finishing second in the group, narrowly missing out on qualifying for the next round.

History
In early 2014, it was announced that the All India Football Federation, the National Federation for Football in India, and IMG-Reliance would be accepting bids for ownership of eight of nine selected cities for the upcoming Indian Super League (ISL), an eight-team franchise league modeled along the lines of the Indian Premier League, the country's professional cricket league.

First season (2014)

On 15 September 2014, the club signed Nicolas Anelka, a former French international who had been a free agent since his departure from West Bromwich Albion earlier in the year. Three days later, former Swedish international Freddie Ljungberg was signed as the team's first marquee player, returning from two years of retirement.

Mumbai were the visitors in the first ever ISL match on 12 October 2014, at Atlético de Kolkata's Salt Lake Stadium. Without Anelka and Ljungberg, the side lost 3–0. On 18 October 2014, the club registered their first victory over FC Pune City by beating them 5–0 at DY Patil Stadium, Mumbai, in which André Moritz registered the first ever hat-trick of ISL. The team finished seventh in the table out of eight and did not qualify for the playoffs.

Second season (2015)

In July 2015, Nicolas Anelka became player-manager, replacing Englishman Peter Reid. Frantz Bertin was appointed captain at the beginning of the season. The club then roped in India captain Sunil Chhetri for a domestic record-breaking deal of ₹1.2 crore, and signed 2015 I-League's player of the year awardee Sony Norde of Haiti. Sunil Chhetri was the top scorer for the team as he scored 7 goals including a hat-trick against NorthEast United FC. Mumbai only won four matches and lost six to finish in sixth position in the league table. Due to such results, Anelka resigned and announced his departure at the end of the season.

Alexandre Guimarães era (2016–2018)

After the first two seasons, Mumbai City's management made big changes as they appointed Alexandre Guimarães as the head coach for the 2016 Indian Super League (ISL) season. The club moved into their new home stadium, the Mumbai Football Arena, at Andheri. The club also signed 2010 FIFA World Cup Golden Ball winner Diego Forlán on a three-month deal, with option to extend for another year as a marquee player for the season.

The arrival of the Uruguayan changed the dynamics of the struggling Mumbai team to title contenders. Forlan scored the first hat-trick of the Hero Indian Super League 2016 season as The Islanders beat Kerala Blasters 5–0 at Mumbai Football Arena on 19 November 2016. It was also the first hat-trick of any marquee player in the history of the ISL. The team conceded the fewest goals (8) of all teams in the league, whilst Lucian Goian finished with the most tackles (67) in the league. Alexandre's men in blues kept 8 clean sheets in the group stage, making it a record across all the three editions of the tournament. As a result, Mumbai City finished the 14 rounds with 6 wins, 5 draws and 3 losses. However, it went down to Atletico de Kolkata in the twin legged semi-finals.

In 2017, Indian Super League announced another auction to make way for new entrants Jamshedpur FC & Bengaluru FC which led to others clubs to start the squad rebuilding process once again. MCFC managed to retain Alexandre Guimarães after he guided the club to their first ever playoffs in three seasons, but they missed out on their star performers including club's all-time top goalscorer Sunil Chhetri. The club did manage to retain Captain & goalkeeper Amrinder Singh for 12.0 million INR. He was also awarded the best goalkeeper in 2016, keeping record clean sheets for the club. They also retained the services of midfielder Sehnaj Singh who was instrumental in the club's success in the previous season. In the foreign department, they retained the defensive duo of Lucian Goian and Gerson Vieira alongside midfielder Leo Costa. They also retained Rakesh Oram, a player under the U-21 player quota. But the new signings did not perform at their very best as they finished the season in 7th position, failing to qualify for the playoffs, with the coach being criticized for overly defensive tactics.

After the ISL season had concluded, Mumbai City FC also took part in the inaugural edition of the Super Cup. They kicked off proceedings smoothly by defeating Indian Arrows by a scoreline reading 2–1 in the qualifier round. However, they were handed a defeat by East Bengal FC in the Round of 16. On 14 August 2018, Mumbai City FC officially stated, "Mumbai City FC and Alexandre Guimarães have parted company by mutual consent." This ended the Guimarães Era with the Brazilian-born Costa Rican manager being with the Islanders since 2016.

Jorge Costa era (2018–2020) 

After the announcement that Mumbai City FC had parted ways with Guimarães, the Islanders broke the news about their new head coach. Former Portugal international & Champions League Winner Jorge Costa signed as the manager of Mumbai City FC for the 2018/19 Indian Super League season. The club also signed Indian Internationals Alen Deory and Subhasish Bose along with some foreign players such as Modou Sougou, Rafael Bastos, Arnold Issoko and Paulo Machado. The team started the season with a 2–0 loss at home to Jamshedpur, followed by a 1–1 draw to Kerala Blasters. The team then recorded a 2–0 win against FC Pune City, and then lost 5–0 to Goa. After that coach Costa made some interesting tactical changes which led to the club's best unbeaten run in history (9 games unbeaten). The team ended December with a 6–1 win against Kerala Blasters, with Modou Sougou scoring 4 of the team's 6 goals in the match, which was a record breaking tally as Sougou became the first player in the league to score 4 goals in a single match, and it was Mumbai's best ever victory against any club. They also managed to break league leaders Bengaluru FC's unbeaten run at Mumbai Football Arena in January.

The club managed to secure a play-off Finish with a 3–1 victory against ATK on 22 February 2019 with a game in hand, thanks to Modou Sougou's second hat-trick in the league, which is also a record for having maximum hat-tricks for the Islanders. The 3rd-place finish saw them face off against FC Goa, which resulted in a 5–1 defeat at Home despite Mumbai opening the scoring. They did manage to bounce back and beat Goa in the Away fixture by a scoreline of 1–0, but it wasn't enough hence the islanders could not play in the 2018/19 ISL Final happening in Mumbai Football Arena itself. Even though Mumbai lost in the Play-offs, Arnold Issoko won the DHL Winning Pass of the League Award for his maximum assists (8 assists) in the League and Modou Sougou became joint second goalscorer with 12 Goals. Fan Favorite Amrinder Singh ended the league with most saves and joint highest number of clean sheets (6). With that positive note, on 19 March 2019, the officials of the club confirmed that Head Coach Jorge Costa had extended his stay at the club. The Portuguese signed a one-year extension and would continue to be at the helm for the Islanders until the end of the 2019/20 season.

The next task at hand for Jorge Costa and his side was the 2019 Hero Super Cup with the Islanders drawn to play Chennaiyin FC in the Round of 16 on 29 March at the Kalinga Stadium in Bhubaneshwar. Costa opted to play with an almost all-Indian Squad having Lucian Goian as the only foreign recruit in their ranks. Costa also promoted two highly rated youngsters from their youth ranks, Mohammed Kaif and Nakul Shelke. The team started off promisingly, but failed to capitalise on the chances created and were eliminated from the Super Cup with a 2–0 defeat.

After announcing the departure of club captain Lucian Goian to Chennaiyin FC before the 2019–20 season, MCFC brought in Mato Grgic, Serge Kevyn, Amine Chermiti, Diego Carlos, and Mohamed Larbi, with the first game of the 2019–20 season resulting in a 1–0 win over Kerala Blasters. On 28 November 2019, City Football Group EPL Giants Manchester City's parent company acquired a major stake in Mumbai City FC. This was the first time a top European club had acquired a majority stake of a club in India. There were ups and downs for Jorge Costa's team but injuries to the mainstays of the team hampered MCFC's good run. In the end, they fell short of the final playoff spot by just three points by virtue of losing to Chennaiyin FC.

Looking back at the records, the Islanders had registered a record statistic as they had 12 players on the scoresheet who had scored the team's total of 25 goals. Costa's Mumbai City had a reputation for being defensively strong and lethal on the counter-attack. It became the first team to do a league double over Bengaluru FC in ISL history and did not lose to them in the two years Costa was at the helm. After finishing fifth, and with the City Football Group ownership coming into full effect, Jorge Costa's reign at the club came to an end.

Acquisition by CFG and success under Sergio Lobera (2020–2021) 

After several months of anticipation, the City Football Group's acquisition of the club came into full effect. Under the new ownership, the club decided to kickstart a new era at the club and signed the former FC Goa coach Sergio Lobera as manager.  The club signed Hugo Boumous from FC Goa, after paying a release clause of ₹1.6 crores, a record fee in Indian football. Along with Boumous, they signed some core players from Goa including Fall, Jahou, Mandar Rao and Jackichand.

During the first phase of the league Mumbai City FC got 25 points from the first 10 matches, which included eight wins, one drew and one loss. Towards the end of league stage, they managed to register only two wins in six games. However, they managed to win in the last two matches of the league stage. A win against ATK Mohun Bagan in the final match of the league stage made them the winners of the League Shield, thus qualifying for the AFC Champions league 2022 group stage. By doing so, they became the second Indian club after FC Goa to play in the Champions League.

The Islanders had earlier sealed their playoff berth with a 3–3 draw against FC Goa, with four league games to go which was the quickest ever qualification in the league (15 Games). Prior to that they were also unbeaten for 12 games. Their first semifinal leg against FC Goa at Fatorda ended in 2–2 draw. The second leg ended in goalless draw, which means the match went onto penalty-shootout. In the shootout they beat FC Goa on 6–5 where Rowllin Borges scored the decisive penalty. In their final against ATK Mohun Bagan at the Fatorda Stadium, they won the game 2–1 with Bipin Singh scoring the decisive goal in the 90th minute. Thus, Mumbai City FC became the first club to win the league winners shield and the ISL trophy in a single season.

Des Buckingham era (2021–present) 
On 8 October 2021, Mumbai City appointed English manager Des Buckingham as head coach on a two-year contract. The club began its 2021–22 season campaign with a 3–0 win on 22 November against FC Goa. Mumbai City finished the season on fifth place and failed to qualify for the playoffs. Ahead of the 2022 AFC Champions League kick-off, the club went to Abu Dhabi for training and defeated Emirati giants Al Ain 2–1 in a friendly match. Under Buckingham, Mumbai City became the first Indian club to win a match in AFC Champions League, as they defeated Al-Quwa Al-Jawiya of Iraq by 2–1. On 4 January 2023 ,on the back of the historic champions league campaign and making Mumbai reach the Durand Cup final in their maiden attempt, losing narrowly to Bengaluru FC by 2-1 in the final  Mumbai City FC extended his contract for 2 years, keeping him at the club till the end of 2024/25 season.

They made a historic maiden run at 2022-23 Indian Super League by becoming League winners for the second time with 2 games to spare. They broke records in that season with most points (46), most wins (14), least defeats (2), most goals scored (54), most positive Goal Difference (33), most successful passes (9047) and longest unbeaten streak (18 matches) since ISL's inception. However, they were beaten by Bengaluru FC and East Bengal FC in the last two league games followed by a third defeat to Bengaluru in the 1st leg of semifinals 0-1. Although they defeated them in the 2nd leg with a scoreline of 1-2 in regulation time and equaled them in an aggregate score of 2-2, they lost on Sudden Death in a highly nerve-wrecking score of 9-8; thereby finishing the hopes for another ISL trophy and becoming the first team to do the double twice but ending a highly successful league campaign.
Des was hugely credited throughout the season in improving the performances of young Indian players, and implementing a fantastic style of possession-based football, the quality of which was not seen in India before

Crest, colours and kits

Colours
In 2020, when the City Football Group purchased the club's majority share, they changed the primary colours into sky blue following the pathway of their parent club Manchester City FC.

The away kit of the club in early years used to be a white kit with royal blue featuring on the collar and sleeves. In 2018, the club changed the away colours into an all golden yellow kit.

Kit evolution

Kit manufacturers and shirt sponsors

Stadium

Mumbai Football Arena, Andheri

However, the Islanders shifted their home base to Mumbai Football Arena from the third season as DY Patil Stadium was allotted to go under construction for 2017 FIFA U-17 World Cup
Mumbai Football Arena is relatively small but a multi-use FIFA and AFC approved stadium, located in the heart of the city. i.e. Andheri Mumbai Football Arena has a capacity of 6,600 seats. The Arena is filled regularly by the team's dedicated fan base. The stadium also has a separate section to accommodate Away fans. The Mumbai Football Arena is modified during the ISL season to incorporate a VIP stand to the east of the stadium.

The team trains at Fr. Agnel Multipurpose School and Jr. College, Vashi and at the NMSA Ground in Vashi.

Supporters 

Mumbai City FC is reputed to have one of the most vocal fan bases in India. The West Coast Brigade is the official fan club of Mumbai City FC, which is known for its support to the team at both home and away matches. West Coast Brigade is held in high regard by the MCFC management, as they have dedicated a stand for West Coast Brigade members in the Mumbai Football Arena.

The players and the coach have often acknowledged the fans' support in the success and always engaged in fans interaction and promotional activities. In 2017, the JDTs became the first club in ISL history to announce a special section for away fans as a progressive step towards football fan culture.

Rivalries

Mumbai City has a rivalry with their neighbourhood club FC Goa, against whom they contest the western derby or western rivalry. The rivalry between Mumbai City FC and FC Goa is something that resonated on the global scale, the roots of which can be traced back to the appointment of Jorge Costa as the Islanders' head coach in 2018. There were traces of the rivalry before, but it started gaining momentum once the Portuguese – a Jose Mourinho ideologist, was appointed. It was natural that Sergio Lobera, whose philosophy is based on Pep Guardiola's Barcelona, would rise up as one of the main threats to the Islanders. The two sides played several interesting battles over the course of the 2018–19 and 2019–20 campaigns.

When Mumbai City face FC Goa in the Indian Super League, it won't be just a match-up between two teams that are likely to challenge for the title come the end of the season.

Mumbai City and Goa go a long way in the Hero ISL and have played out some of the most fascinating contests in the competition’s history. And when that happens, there is a birth of a rivalry, a healthy rivalry, but a rivalry nonetheless.

The two teams have played each other 18 times in the Hero ISL. The Islanders have played more games against the Gaurs than any other team, while FC Goa have played more games against Mumbai City than all teams except Chennaiyin.

The Gaurs have scored 38 goals against Mumbai City FC, more than they have scored against any other opposition in the Hero ISL. This is also the highest any team has scored against any opposition in Hero ISL history. Mumbai City's three worst losses in Hero ISL history have come at the hands of FC Goa. A 7–0 loss in November 2015, A 5–0 loss in October 2018, and a 5–1 loss in March 2019.

But there is more to this simmering rivalry than just on-field results. Before the starting of 2020–21 season, Mumbai City FC under new ownership of CFG raided FC Goa and signed five key players from the Gaurs in Ahmed Jahouh, Mourtada Fall, Hugo Boumous, Mandar Rao Dessai and Amey Ranawade. The Islanders also roped in head coach Sergio Lobera who had been sacked by the Gaurs just a season before adding more spice to the rivalry.

Even ahead of 2021–22 season, Mumbai City FC brought FC Goa's top scorer Igor Angulo to the club to further weaken their challengers.

On February 11, 2023 Mumbai Thrashed FC Goa by 5-3 at Fatorda to clinch their second premiership in three seasons with 2 games to spare.

Ownership
On 13 April 2014, IMG Reliance announced that actor Ranbir Kapoor had won the bidding for the Mumbai franchise to be the eighth team in the inaugural season of Indian Super League with Bimal Parekh as co-owner.

City Football Group

On 28 November 2019, it was revealed that City Football Group had bought a 65% stake in the club, adding Mumbai City FC as the eighth club under city group. City Football Group's ownership of the club opened up a plethora of opportunities in the future, with transfer of knowledge, and access to opportunities for players and club officials alike.

Players

First-team squad

Other players under contract

Out on loan

Reserves and academy

Mumbai City FC fielded a reserve team in the 2019–20 I-League 2nd Division. Players like Mohammed Kaif and Nakul Shelke were promoted to the first team for the Super Cup after their performances in the 2nd Division. In late November 2019, academy graduate Asif Khan signed his first professional contract with Mumbai City FC until 2024 which made him the first MCFC academy player to sign a professional contract with the club.

Personnel

Corporate hierarchy

Technical hierarchy

Football sport management

Statistics and records

Managerial

Honours

Domestic
 Indian Super League
 Championship
 Winners (1): 2020–21
 Premiership
 Winners (2): 2020–21, 2022-23
 Durand Cup
 Runners-up (1): 2022

Youth 
 MFA Independence Cup
 Champions (1): 2022
 DPDL Mumbai U14
 Champions (1): 2023

AFC Club Ranking

Continental record

Affiliated clubs
The following clubs are currently affiliated with Mumbai City FC via City Football Group:
  Manchester City (2019–present)
  New York City (2019–present)
  Melbourne City (2019–present)
  Yokohama F. Marinos (2019–present)
  Girona (2019–present)
  Montevideo City Torque (2019–present)
  Sichuan Jiuniu (2019–present)
  Lommel (2020–present)
  Troyes (2020–present)

See also
 List of football clubs in India

Notes

References

External links 
 
 
 Mumbai City FC at ESPN
 Mumbai City FC at WorldFootball.net
 Mumbai City FC at City Football Group
 Mumbai City FC at Global Sports Archive

Mumbai City FC
Football clubs in Mumbai
Association football clubs established in 2014
Indian Super League teams
2014 establishments in Maharashtra
City Football Group